Anthony Phillip Sanchez (born January 25, 1974) is an American college football coach and former wide receiver, who is the current wide receivers coach of the New Mexico State Aggies. He was the head coach of the UNLV Rebels from December 8, 2014 until he was fired by UNLV on November 25, 2019. He was previously the head football coach at Bishop Gorman High School.

Early life and college playing career
Sanchez was born on Travis Air Force Base in Fairfield, California, where his father was stationed. Sanchez graduated from Granada High School in Livermore, California in 1992 and began his college football career as a wide receiver at Laney College, a junior college in nearby Oakland. In 1994, Sanchez transferred to New Mexico State University, where he played two seasons with the New Mexico State Aggies. Sanchez made 54 receptions for 741 yards and 5 touchdowns in his two seasons at NMSU.

Coaching career
Sanchez began his coaching career in 1996 as an undergraduate assistant at New Mexico State; he would eventually complete his bachelor's degree in family and consumer science at NMSU in 1998. After graduating from NMSU, Sanchez spent the 1998 season as wide receivers coach at Onate High School, like NMSU in Las Cruces, New Mexico. In 2000, Sanchez became wide receivers coach at Irvin High School in El Paso, Texas. Sanchez returned to Onate High in 2001 to be defensive backs coach. In 2003, Sanchez was promoted to be defensive coordinator in addition to defensive backs coach at the school.

In 2004, Sanchez got his first head coaching position at California High School in San Ramon, California. Sanchez turned around California High "from doormat status to a berth in the North Coast Section finals," according to ESPN.

Sanchez became head coach at Bishop Gorman High School in Las Vegas, Nevada in 2009 and would be head coach at the school for six seasons. In his tenure as Gorman head coach, Sanchez achieved an 85–5 record and led Gorman to the Nevada Interscholastic Activities Association 4A championship every season.

On December 16, 2014, the Nevada System of Higher Education Board of Regents voted unanimously to hire Sanchez as head coach at UNLV. He was succeeded at Bishop Gorman by his brother, Kenneth.

Sanchez and UNLV agreed to part ways on November 25, 2019. He coached his final game for the Rebels against Nevada on November 30. He finished with a career record of 20–40.

Sanchez joined the staff at TCU as an offensive analyst in 2021.

Personal life
Sanchez is of Puerto Rican and English descent. He is divorced and has two children. The National Catholic Register describes Sanchez as a "devout Catholic".

Head coaching record

High school

College

References

External links
 
 New Mexico State profile

1974 births
Living people
American football wide receivers
Laney Eagles football players
New Mexico State Aggies football coaches
New Mexico State Aggies football players
TCU Horned Frogs football coaches
UNLV Rebels football coaches
High school football coaches in California
High school football coaches in Nevada
High school football coaches in New Mexico
High school football coaches in Texas
People from Fairfield, California
People from Livermore, California
Coaches of American football from California
Players of American football from California
American Roman Catholics
American people of English descent
American sportspeople of Puerto Rican descent